Walter Haummer (22 November 1928 - 5 October 2008) was an Austrian football forward who played for Austria in the 1954 FIFA World Cup. He also played for FC Admira Wacker Mödling.

References

External links

1928 births
Austrian footballers
Austria international footballers
Association football forwards
FC Admira Wacker Mödling players
1954 FIFA World Cup players
2008 deaths